The 2018 NASCAR PEAK Mexico Series was the eleventh season of the NASCAR PEAK Mexico Series and the fourteenth season organized by NASCAR Mexico. It began with the Gran Premio Difrenosa at Autódromo Monterrey on 25 March and concluded with the Gran Premio FedEx at Autódromo Hermanos Rodríguez on 2 December. Abraham Calderón entered the season as the defending Drivers' champion. Rubén García Jr. won the championship, nineteen points in front of Irwin Vences. And Fabián Welter was declared the Rookie of the Year.

Drivers

Schedule
On 25 January 2018, NASCAR announced the 2018 schedule. León and Pachuca were dropped from the schedule in favor of El Dorado and a road course race at Aguascalientes. The race in El Marqués was held on the road course instead of the oval.

Results and standings

Races

Drivers' championship

(key) Bold – Pole position awarded by time. Italics – Pole position set by final practice results or Owners' points. * – Most laps led.

Notes
 They receive championship points in supporter series.
2 – Víctor Barrales qualified in the No. 30 for Víctor Barrales Jr.
3 – Pepe González received championship points, despite the fact that he did not start the race.
4 – Enrique Baca qualified in the No. 8 for Rafael Martínez.

See also

2018 Monster Energy NASCAR Cup Series
2018 NASCAR Xfinity Series
2018 NASCAR Camping World Truck Series
2018 NASCAR K&N Pro Series East
2018 NASCAR K&N Pro Series West
2018 NASCAR Whelen Modified Tour
2018 NASCAR Pinty's Series
2018 NASCAR Whelen Euro Series

References

External links

NASCAR PEAK Mexico Series

NASCAR Mexico Series